Danne is both a surname and a given name. Notable people with the name include:

Surname 
Günther Danne (born 1942), German sports shooter
Wolfgang Danne (born 1941),German pair skater

Given name 
Danne Boterenbrood (born 1985), Dutch triathlete
Danne Larsson (born 1948), Swedish singer-songwriter, guitarist and businessman
Danne Stråhed (born 1956), Swedish singer
Danne Sundman (1973–2018), Finnish politician

See also 
Danne-et-Quatre-Vents, a commune in the Moselle department in Grand Est in north-eastern France